Märket ("The Mark") is a  uninhabited skerry in the Baltic Sea shared by Sweden and Finland (in the area of the autonomous region Åland), with a lighthouse as its salient humanmade feature. Märket has been divided between the two countries since the Treaty of Fredrikshamn of 1809 defined the border between Sweden and the Russian Empire as going through the middle of the island. The Finnish side of the island is part of the Municipality of Hammarland and is the westernmost land point of Finland. The Swedish part of the island is itself divided by two counties of Sweden: Uppsala County (Östhammar Municipality) and Stockholm County (Norrtälje Municipality).

Geography and history

The  Understen–Märket Passage links the Bothnian Sea to the Baltic proper. It is the smallest sea island shared by two countries.

It used to have a straight border until the Grand Duchy of Finland built the lighthouse on the Swedish side and then, they had to change the border.
The name Märket ('the Mark') probably comes from its usefulness as a navigation mark before there were lighthouses. Before the lighthouse was erected, the island and its shallows were dangerous navigational hazards, which seafarers tried desperately to avoid. In 1873, as many as 23 ships were grounded on the Swedish coast and its archipelago trying to avoid Märket, and eight of them were shipwrecked. There is no deep harbor; the island can only be reached with boats. There are small, barely surfacing rocks northwest of Märket, called Märketshällor ("stones of Märket"), which are too small to sustain vegetation.

Most of the area is regularly washed over with seawater in storms, and scoured by drift ice in winter. Plant life, which is limited to low-growing grasses and herbs, persists only in some protected spots. Twenty-three plant species have been identified altogether. The halophilic grass Puccinellia capillaris and the herbaceous Sagina nodosa (knotted pearlwort) are found scattered throughout the island. Among rarer species, Spergularia marina (salt sandspurry) grows on Märket. Salix caprea (goat willow) grows on an abandoned building.

There are large grey seal communities around Märket, and the island has been a target for seal safaris.

International border and lighthouse
There is a lighthouse on the Finnish side of the current border, which has been unmanned and automated since 1979. When it was built by the Grand Duchy of Finland (then part of the Russian Empire) in 1885, the island was considered a no-man's land, so the lighthouse was simply built upon the highest point of the island. However, the location selected was within the Swedish portion of the island. Though the lighthouse was formally on the Swedish side of the border, it was never considered Swedish, or administrated from Sweden.

As a result, the border was adjusted in 1985 so that the lighthouse is now located on Finnish territory. The adjustment was carried out such that no net transfer of territory occurred, and the ownership of the coastline was unchanged so as not to interfere with each country's fishing rights.

This resulted in an unusual shape for the international border to satisfy both Finnish and Swedish interests. The adjusted border takes the form of an inverted 'S', and the lighthouse is connected to the rest of Finland only by a short stretch of land. The border is regularly resurveyed every 25 years by officials representing both countries. The last such joint inspection took place in August 2006. The border is marked by holes drilled into the rock, because the seasonal drift ice would shear off any protruding markers. Because of the Nordic Passport Union and the Schengen Agreement, there have been no passport checks or other border formalities at the border since 1958, so intra-Nordic/intra-Schengen visitors may visit the island freely.

The lighthouse is in urgent need of maintenance, and a Finnish interest group is trying to raise funds for its preservation. The lighthouse has been automated since 1979 and the surrounding buildings are no longer used. The increasing general availability of GPS has made the lighthouse's primary function redundant.

Radio amateurs activity 
Radio amateurs around the world consider the Finnish part of Märket Reef (as they call it) a separate entity, distinct from Finland and Sweden. The Finnish part of Märket Reef used to be one of the world's most desired "countries" to contact among radio amateurs because of its special status and relative remoteness. One or more amateur radio expeditions to the island occur most years, weather permitting. During these expeditions, tens of thousands of radio contacts are made with people in several parts of the world. At high seas, landing is only possible with a helicopter. Pictures of Märket are shown on QSL cards. The official prefix for use on the Finnish side is OJ0 call sign prefix for Märket Reef. An OJ0 vanity callsign can be obtained, for a fee, from Traficom.fi, the Finnish Transport and Communication Agency.  Amateurs with licenses in countries supporting CEPT can operate from the reef while using the OJ0/ prefix in front of one's own call sign.  All radio activity on the island is by visitors on DX-peditions. When the Finnish part of the reef was given its special status in amateur radio, in the late 1960s the lighthouse keeper himself became a licensed amateur radio operator, who initially used the call OH0MA. On the Swedish side of Märket Reef, the call signs 8S9M and SI8MI have been used.

Climate 
Märket has a continental climate affected by oceanic influences; it has a reputation for being one of the windiest places in Finland. A meteorological station has been managed by the lighthouse keepers since 1896, and an automatic station of the Finnish Meteorological Institute was inaugurated on November 10, 1977, shortly before its automation.

The effect of the sea is very important to the climate of the island; thermal inertia dramatically reduces the temperature fluctuations during the year compared to those of the continent, and to a lesser extent, those of the central part of Fasta Åland, the largest island of the archipelago of Åland. The island is drier than the mainland; the average annual rainfall does not usually surpass .

See also
 List of divided islands
 Kataja
 Bogskär and Lågskär, other detached Finnish islands
 Utö, Finland
 Nuorgam
 Fort Blunder, an American fort mistakenly built in Canada

References

Gallery

External links

2021 OJ0D Satellite Radio DXpedition to Märket
 https://sral.info/2018/06/19/market-calling/
2007 Radio DXpedition to Märket 
Configurable map centred on Märket from Citizen's Mapsite of Finland
The Swedish Lighthouse Society's site on Märket
Market Reef at MostTraveledPeople.com
Joint border survey between Finland and Sweden in progress from  Helsingin Sanomat (International  Edition), includes paragraph about Märket, with a small map.
A recent air photo of the island
The New York Times on the island
The Finnish Lighthouse Society

Divided regions
Landforms of Åland
Uppland
Finnish islands in the Baltic
Swedish islands in the Baltic
International islands
Finland–Sweden border
Uninhabited islands of Finland
Uninhabited islands of Sweden
Islands of Norrtälje Municipality
Islands of Uppsala County
Skerries
Former populated places in Finland